Schanskop Commando was a light infantry regiment of the South African Army. It formed part of the South African Army Infantry Formation as well as the South African Territorial Reserve.

History

Origin

Operation

With the SADF
During this era, the unit was mainly used for area force protection, search and cordones as well as stock theft control assistance to the rural police.

With the SANDF

Amalgamation
Regiment Tshwane was originally established as the Yskor Pretoria Commando in 1969 and over the years several commando units and regiments, such as Hillcrest, Munitoria, Regiments Pretorius as well as 2 Regiment Noord-Transvaal were amalgamated with Regiment Schanskop.

In December 2002, the name "Tshwane Regiment" was approved to be in line with the area where the Regiment is situated.

Unit Insignia

Leadership

References

See also 
 South African Commando System

Infantry regiments of South Africa
South African Commando Units
Disbanded military units and formations in Pretoria